The 2021–22 Little Rock Trojans women's basketball team represented the University of Arkansas at Little Rock during the 2021–22 NCAA Division I women's basketball season. The basketball team, led by nineteenth-year head coach Joe Foley, played all home games at the Jack Stephens Center along with the Little Rock Trojans men's basketball team. They were members of the Sun Belt Conference.

Roster

Schedule and results

|-
!colspan=9 style=| Non-conference Regular Season
|-

|-
!colspan=9 style=| Conference Regular Season
|-

|-
!colspan=9 style=| Non-conference Regular Season
|-

|-
!colspan=9 style=| Conference Regular Season
|-

|-
!colspan=9 style=| Non-conference Regular Season
|-

|-
!colspan=9 style=| Conference Regular Season
|-

|-
!colspan=9 style=| Sun Belt Tournament

See also
 2021–22 Little Rock Trojans men's basketball team

References

Little Rock Trojans women's basketball seasons
Little Rock Trojans
Little Rock Trojans women's basketball
Little Rock Trojans women's basketball